The Lithuanian A Lyga 2005 was the 16th season of top-tier football in Lithuania. The season started on 12 April 2005 and ended on 12 November 2005. 10 teams participated with Ekranas winning the championship.

League standings

Results

First half of season

Second half of season

Top goalscorers
Mantas Savėnas (Ekranas) – 27 goals
Tomas Radzinevičius (Sūduva) – 25 goals
Povilas Lukšys (Ekranas) – 19 goals

See also 
 2005 LFF Lyga

References 

LFF Lyga seasons
1
Lith
Lith